Vicente Palacios Díaz (born July 19, 1963) is a Mexican former professional baseball pitcher. He played all or parts of eight seasons in Major League Baseball for the Pittsburgh Pirates (1987–88 and 1990–92), St. Louis Cardinals (1994–95) and San Diego Padres (2000).

Palacios began his professional career in the Mexican League in 1983 for the Rojos del Águila de Veracruz. In 1984, he was purchased from Veracruz by the Chicago White Sox, but after two seasons with their double-A farm team, the Glens Falls White Sox, he was released. He was then signed by the Pirates, making his debut with them in September 1987. He was a member of the Pirates National League East division champions for three straight seasons, from 1990 to 1992.

After being released by the Pirates following the 1992 season, Palacios was signed by the Cardinals. After spending spring training with the Padres, he returned to Mexico for a season before signing with the Cardinals. He spent two seasons with St. Louis before being released after the 1995 season. After returning to Mexico once more for three years, he was picked up by the New York Mets in July 1999, appearing in seven games for their Norfolk Tides affiliate. He became a free agent after the season, signing with the Padres. He made his final major league appearance in May 2000, and was released that August. He was picked up by the Chicago Cubs, finishing the year with the triple-A Iowa Cubs. He returned to Mexico once more in 2001, playing for the Saraperos de Saltillo, the Piratas de Campeche, and finally the Tecolotes de los Dos Laredos in 2003 before retiring at age 40.

In 8 Major League Baseball seasons, Palacios had a 17–20 win–loss record. He appeared in 134 games, including 44 games started, 2 of which were complete games, both shutouts. In his 90 relief appearances, he finished 26 games, including 7 saves. In 372 innings pitched, Palacios allowed 348 hits, including 44 home runs. He gave 190 runs, 183 of them earned runs for an earned run average of 4.43. He walked 158 batters while striking out 270.

Sources

1963 births
Living people
Baseball players from Veracruz
Buffalo Bisons (minor league) players
Glens Falls White Sox players
Iowa Cubs players
Las Vegas Stars (baseball) players
Major League Baseball pitchers
Major League Baseball players from Mexico
Mexican expatriate baseball players in Canada
Mexican expatriate baseball players in the United States
Mexican League baseball pitchers
Norfolk Tides players
Piratas de Campeche players
Pittsburgh Pirates players
Rojos del Águila de Veracruz players
San Diego Padres players
Saraperos de Saltillo players
St. Louis Cardinals players
Tecolotes de los Dos Laredos players
Toros de Tijuana players
Vancouver Canadians players